William Leonard Buckley (6 April 1896 – 3 May 1946) was an Australian rules footballer who played with Collingwood in the Victorian Football League (VFL).

Notes

External links 

Bill Buckley's profile at Collingwood Forever

1896 births
1946 deaths
Australian rules footballers from Victoria (Australia)
Collingwood Football Club players